The Morais ophiolite complex, also known as Morais Massif (in Portuguese, Maciço de Morais), is located in the northeast of Portugal in the Bragança District, with its main core in the Macedo de Cavaleiros Municipality. Generally speaking the Morais ophiolite complex is a set of allochthonous units, which include a full range of ultramafic rocks.

Geological uniqueness
Its uniqueness lies in the fact that, within a radius of about 50 km, it's possible to see the geologic evidences of the continental collision between Laurussia and Gondwana with the consequent closure of the Rheic Ocean, to form the supercontinent of Pangaea in the Late Paleozoic (Variscan orogeny). 

This Geologic Complex presents three main units:  
 the terrains once belonging to the stress edge of the Gondwana continent
 the ophiolite: a complete sequence of oceanic crust (obduction of the Rheic Ocean)
 the terrains once belonging to the Laurussia continent

See also

Notes

Sources
Pereira, E., Ribeiro, A., Castro, P.F., 2000 – Carta Geológica de Portugal à escala 1:50.000. Notícia explicativa da Folha 7 - D (Macedo de Cavaleiros). Serv. Geol. de Portugal.
Pereira, E., Ribeiro, A., Castro, P. & De Oliveira, D., 2004 – Complexo Ofiolítico Varisco do Maciço de Morais (NE de Trás-os-Montes, Portugal). In Pereira, E., Castroviejo, R. &
Ortiz, F. (Eds.), “Complejos Ofiolíticos en Iberoamérica – Guías de Exploración para Metales Preciosos”, pp. 265–284. Proyecto XIII.1 – CYTED, Madrid, España.
Pereira, Z., Meireles, C. e Pereira, E., 1999 – Upper Devonian Palynomorphs of NE Sector of Trás-os-Montes (Central Iberian Zone). XV Reun. Geol. Oeste Peninsular, Resumos, pp. 201–206
Pin, C., Paqette, J.L., Ibarguchi, J.G., Zalduegui, J.F., Aller, J.R. and Cuesta, L.A., 2000 - Geochronological and geochemical constraints on the origin of the ophiolitic units from the Northwestern Iberian Massif. GALICIA 2000, Variscan-Appalachian dynamics: the building of the Upper Paleozoic basement, Abstracts, pp. 146–147.
Rebelo, J.A. e Romano, M., 1986 - A contribution to the lithostragraphy and paleontology of the lower Paleozoic rocks of the Moncorvo region, Northeast of Portugal. Com. Serv. Geol. Portugal, T. 72, fasc.1/2, pp. 45–57.
Ribeiro, A., 1974 - Contribution à l'étude tectonique de Trás-os-Montes Oriental. Serv. Geol. de Portugal, Mem. 24, 168 p.
Ribeiro, A., Marcos, A., Pereira, E., Llana-Fúnez, S., Farias, P., Fernández, F.J., Fonseca, P., Chaminé, H.I. and Rosas, F., 2003 - 3-D strain distribution in the Ibero-Armorican Arc: a review. VI Cong. Nac. Geologia, Lisboa, Actas: D63-D64; Ciências da Terra (UNL), nº esp V, CD-Rom, D63-D64.
Ribeiro, A., Pereira, E. and Dias, R., 1990 - Structure in the NW of the Iberia Peninsula (Alloctonous sequences). In: Dallmeyer, R.D. and Martinez Garcia, E. (Eds.): Pre- Mesozoic Geology of Iberia, Springer-Verlag, p. 220-236.
Ribeiro, A., Silva, J.B., Dias, R., Pereira, E., Oliveira, J.T., Rebelo, J.A., Romão, J. e Silva, A.F., 1991 – Sardic inversion tectonics in the Centro-Iberian Zone. III Congr. Nac. Geol., Resumos, Coimbra, p. 71.
Ribeiro, M. L, 1986 - Geologia e Petrologia da região a Sw de macedo de Cavaleiros (Trás-os-Montes). Tese, Fac.Cienc. Univ. Lisboa, 202 p.
Rodrigues, J., Pereira, E. e Ribeiro, A., 2006 – Estrutura interna do Complexo de Mantos Parautóctones, sector de Murça-Mirandela (NE de Portugal). In: Dias, R & Araújo, A.(Eds.) Geologia de Portugal no Contexto da Ibéria. Universidade de Évora, pp. 63–84.
Sá, A.A., 2006 – A sucessão do Ordovícico superior de Trás-os-Montes (Zona Centro-Ibérica,Portugal) e sua correlação com Valongo e Buçaco. VII Cong. Nac.de Geologia, Univ. Évora, Livro de Resumos II, pp. 621–624.
Sousa, M. B., 1982 - Litostratigrafia e Estrutura do Complexo xisto grauváquico ante-Ordovícico - Grupo do Douro (NW de Portugal). Tese Univ. Coimbra, 222 p.
Teixeira, C. e Pais, J., 1973 - Sobre a presença de Devónico na região de Bragança (Guadramil e Mofreita) e de Alcañices (Zamora). Bol. Soc. Geol. Portugal, 18, pp. 199–202

External links
GePortal.LNEG.pt: Inicio
Azibo.org: Azibo Reservoir Protected Landscape website

Geology of Portugal
Carboniferous Europe
Permian System of Europe
Geologic formations of Europe
Ophiolites
Suture zones